Ekeremor is one of the eight local government areas (LGAs) in Bayelsa State, Nigeria. It borders Delta State and has a coastline of approximately 60 km on the Bight of Bonny. Its headquarters are in the town of Ekeremor in the northeast of the area.

It has an area of 1,810 km2 and a population of 270,257 at the 2006 census.

The postal code of the area is 561.

Demographics
Ekeremor LGA is home to members of the Ekeremor clan of the Ijaw ethnic group. According to the Nigeria 2006 Census, Ekeremor LGA has a population of roughly 270,000 people (53% male, 47% female).

List of Towns and Villages in Ekeremor Local Government Area 
The Ekeremor LGA consists of twenty eight (28) Towns and villages listed below:

 Aiegbe
 Aleibiri
 Amabulour
 Ananagbene
 Angalawei-gbene
 Ayamassa
 Bown-Adagbabiri
 Ebikeme-Gbene
 Eduwini
 Egbemo-Angalabiri
 Ekeremor
 Feremoama
 Fontoru-Gbene
 Isampou
 Isreal o-Zion
 Lalagbene
 Ndoro
 Norhene
 Obrigbene
 Ogbogbene
 Ogbosuwar
 Oporoma
 Oyiakiri
 Peretou-Gbene
 Tamogbene
 Tamu-Gbene
 Tarakiri
 Tietiegbene
 Toru-Foutorugbene
 Aghoro

Politics
As of August 2007, Robinson Etolor was chairman of the local government council. However, there has been a long-running dispute over the post between Etulor and his predecessor Donald Daunemigha.

Ekeremor LGA sends three representatives to the Bayelsa State House of Assembly.

Bayelsa State Deputy Governor Peremobowei Ebebi is a native of Aleibiri town in Ekeremor LGA. Before becoming deputy governor, he represented Ekeremor I constituency in the Bayelsa State House of Assembly.

Ekeremor local government Chairman Dr. Bertola Perekeme has hailed the Supreme Court of Nigeria for upholding it’s a judgement on the Bayelsa State election.

Significant events
 December 2007: Pa Simon Ebebi, father of Bayelsa State Deputy Governor Peremobowei Ebebi was kidnapped at his home at Aleibiri. He was later released after an undisclosed ransom was paid.
 October 2007: Farmlands and residential homes in 21 communities in Ekeremor LGA were flooded. The communities affected by the flood were Amalka-Zion, Oboloseria, Aleibiri, Lalagbene, Angalaweigbene (1, 2, and 3).
 16 July 2007: Two expatriates (Bulgarian, British) working for Peak Petroleum (a contractor working for Chevron/Texaco) were kidnapped and held in the village of Alabeni in Ekeremor LGA. The workers were kidnapped from the vessel Monipo by armed youths traveling in four speed boats. The Authentic Emancipation of the Movement for Peace and Development in the Niger Delta (EMOPEND) claimed responsibility for the abduction.

Climate
Ekeremor,a local government in Bayelsa State ,Nigeria. The wet season is warm and overcast, the dry season is cloudy and hot, and it is oppressive all through the year. Over the course of the year, the temperature typically varies from 71 °F to 87 °F and is rarely below 64 °F or above 89 °F.

References

Local Government Areas in Bayelsa State
Populated coastal places in Nigeria